Beaune-la-Rolande internment camp was an internment and transit camp for foreign-born Jews (men, women, and children), located in Beaune-la-Rolande in occupied France, it was operational between May 1941 and July 1943, during World War II.

The camp was first established in 1939, to house future German prisoners of war (POWs). In 1940, following the fall of France, the Germans used it to intern French POW's. On 14 May 1941, the first Jewish prisoners, most of them Polish, arrived following the green ticket roundup, the camp became an internment camp for foreign-born Jews administered by the Loiret prefect under Nazi supervision. The camp consisted of 14 barracks, surrounded by barbed wire and watchtowers and guarded by French gendarmes, the detainees had to perform work inside the camp and at the local farms and plants outside the camp. It was a Type 1 camp meaning that all the inmates were there by decision of the German occupying authorities. In May 1942, by order of Theodor Dannecker, the Germans took over operations from the French and began deporting most of the internees, including 1,500 children. In September 1942 the camp became an internment facility for non-Jewish communist prisoners. The camp was closed on 4 August 1943.

Together with Pithiviers and Jargeau, Beaune-la-Rolande was one of three internment camps established in the Loiret. During its existence 6,800 foreign and French-born Jews, including 1,500 children, passed through the camp, most of them were eventually deported and murdered at Auschwitz-Birkenau.

History
Beaune-la-Rolande camp was initially built in 1939 to receive future German prisoners of war (POWs), it was converted after the Fall of France into a German camp to hold French POWs before their transfer to camps in Germany. Beaune-la-Rolande and the neighbouring Pithiviers camp, with which it was closely associated, were two sites of  an internment camp founded by the Wehrmacht on 20 July 1940. Both camps were greatly overpopulated holding about 13,000 prisoners each according to an inspection by a German commander. A review by a French humanitarian organisation found 14,000 held in Beaune-la-Rolande many suffering from dysentery, the French authority confirmed, in late 1940, that the detainees, many of them colonial troops from Morocco and Algeria, were on the brink of starvation. In addition to prisoners of war, both Beaune-la-Rolande and Pithiviers also held French political prisoners.   was disbanded on 21 March 1941.

The first prisoners to arrive in May 1941 were 1,552 foreign and stateless Jews, mainly Polish men from the Paris area, victims of the Green ticket roundup.

In May 1942, SS-Hauptsturmführer Theodor Dannecker ordered German authorities across France to take over operations of the camps from the French, prisoners were not allowed to leave the camp or to perform labour and deportations began. A thousand Parisian Jews, mostly women and children, were transferred to Beaune-la-Rolande on 20 July 1942, following the Vel d’Hiv roundup.  As August 1942 began, 1,500 children remained in Beaune-la-Rolande (as well as in Pithiviers) after their parents were deported to Auschwitz. On 19, 22 and 25 August the children were sent to Drancy before being deported to Auschwitz where they were sent to the gas chambers and murdered. In September 1942 the camp reverted to French control and became an internment facility for non-Jewish communist prisoners.

The camp was closed on 4 August 1943 by S.S. Sturmbannführer Alois Brunner, then commander of Drancy concentration camp, and his deputy Ernst Brückler, under direct orders from Heinrich Himmler.

The camp was administered by the prefectural office of the Loiret but frequently inspected by representatives of the German occupying authorities. Inmates were housed across 19 barracks and guarded by French gendarmes under Nazi oversight. At the end of 1941, these consisted of four officers, 80 gendarmes, 43 customs officers and 22 auxiliary guards, totalling 120 men. 

The prisoners performed forced labour within the camp's workshops and garden, and outside at the farms and plants in the surrounding villages. Beaune-la-Rolande was closely associated with the Pithiviers camp, located 18 kilometres (11 miles) away. Between 20 July and 23 August 1941, 313 of Beaune-la-Rolande's 2,000 prisoners managed to escape custody, usually from worksites outside the camp, 85 for the last week of July alone, this represented more than 15% of the total population of the camp and had been helped, according to the authorities, by the negligence of the French gendarmes.

Deportations

Two convoys left Beaune-la-Rolande for Auschwitz-Birkenau in 1942.
 Convoy 5 of 28 June 1942 (1,038 deportees)  1.034 men and 34 women
 Convoy 15 of 5 August 1942 (1,014 deportees) 425 men and 589 women

Notable Beaune-la-Rolande incarcerees
 René Blum, founder of the Ballet de l'Opéra at Monte Carlo, was interned in the camp.
 The Austrian-born French composer Ralph Erwin died while being held in the camp.
 Polish artist Zber was imprisoned in the camp, where he completed some of his paintings, before his deportation to Auschwitz.

Commemoration

In 1965, a stele was constructed at the site in memory of the Jewish internees, on 14 may 1989, a larger monument in black marble with a list of victims and a gold star of David etched out on its summit was added. On the stele, is inscribed the following phrase:

In popular culture
 Sarah's Key, a 2010 French film taking place during and after the Vel' d'Hiv Roundup based on a novel by Tatiana de Rosnay.
 The Round Up, a 2010 French film about the Vel' d'Hiv Roundup and the events surrounding it.
 Illusions perdues 1941-1942. Fragments d’une vie en sursis. A 2011 French documentary about the victims of the Beaune-la-Rolande camp.
 Beaune-la-Rolande, a 2003 book by Cécile Wajsbrot.
 After the Roundup, escape and Survival in Hitler's France, a 2017 biography book by Joseph Weismann that inspired the movie The Round Up.
 , a 1991 book by Annette Muller.

See also

 The Holocaust in France
 Holocaust train
 Green ticket roundup
 Vel' d'Hiv Roundup

Notes

References

Sources

Bibliography

Websites
 
 
 
 
 
 

Buildings and structures in Loiret
World War II internment camps in France
Nazi concentration camps in France
Deportation
Vichy France